Scutellaria formosana (蓝花黄芩, lan hua huang qin) is a plant species endemic to the Fujian, Guangdong, Guangxi, Hainan, Jiangxi, and Yunnan provinces in China. It grows on woody stems up to about 30 cm in height, with ovate to ovate-lanceolate leaves 3-8 × 1.5-3.3 cm.

References
 N. E. Brown, Gard. Chron., ser. 3. 16: 212. 1894.
 eFloras entry
 The Plant List entry

formosana
Endemic flora of China
Flora of Fujian
Flora of Guangdong
Flora of Guangxi
Flora of Hainan
Flora of Jiangxi
Flora of Yunnan
Taxa named by N. E. Brown